Fabio Basile (born 7 October 1994 in Rivoli) is an Italian judoka.

Biography
He competed at the 2016 Summer Olympics in Rio de Janeiro and won the gold medal in the men's 66 kg on 7 August 2016 - the 200th Olympic gold medal for Italy.

Basile represents the judo club Akiyama Settimo from Settimo Torinese near Torino and is the club's first olympic champion.

References

External links

 
 
 
 
 

1994 births
Living people
Italian male judoka
Olympic judoka of Italy
Judoka at the 2016 Summer Olympics
Olympic gold medalists for Italy
Medalists at the 2016 Summer Olympics
Olympic medalists in judo
Judoka at the 2010 Summer Youth Olympics
Mediterranean Games bronze medalists for Italy
Mediterranean Games medalists in judo
Competitors at the 2013 Mediterranean Games
European Games competitors for Italy
Judoka at the 2019 European Games
Judoka of Gruppo Sportivo Esercito
Competitors at the 2018 Mediterranean Games
Judoka at the 2020 Summer Olympics
21st-century Italian people